Meltdown: Live in Mexico City is a Blu-ray and triple-disc CD live album by the English progressive rock band King Crimson. Recorded over five nights in July 2017, Meltdown was released on 20 October 2018 and was produced by the band's keyboardist Bill Rieflin from Multitrack recordings. The release was announced in August 2018 and was preceded by streaming of the track "Indiscipline" on 4 October.

Content
Comprising three compact discs and a Blu-ray, Meltdown: Live in Mexico City is a robust package documenting an incarnation of King Crimson that the group's founder Robert Fripp described as "the best band I’ve been in, musically, personally, professionally." The three CDs distill King Crimson's five concerts in Mexico City from 14 to 19 July 2017 down to three and a half hours, and the Blu-ray video further condenses the performances to two and a half hours.

Meltdown marked the first release to feature recordings of the band's extended lineup playing "Breathless", "Discipline", "Moonchild" and the cadenzas of Tony Levin and Jeremy Stacey. These recordings are taken from concerts during the band's June–July 2018 European tour, and are featured at the end of the third disc as the 2018 Official Bootleg.

In his road diary, Levin surmised that the series of concerts would impact how the band played in the future.

Critical reception

Writing for All About Jazz, John Kelman praised Meltdown, highlighting the video recording of the performance as well-edited. He considered the release an improvement on 2016's similar box set, Radical Action to Unseat the Hold of Monkey Mind.

Track listing

Personnel
Credits adapted from liner notes

King Crimson
 Robert Fripp – guitar, keyboards, production, liner notes
 Mel Collins – saxophones, flute
 Tony Levin – basses, Stick, backing vocals, photography
 Pat Mastelotto – drums, percussion, additional footage
 Gavin Harrison – drums
 Jeremy Stacey – drums, keyboards
 Jakko Jakszyk – guitar, flute, voice
 Bill Rieflin – keyboards, mix production

Technical personnel
 David Singleton – production, compilation, mastering, photography
 Don Gunn – mixing
Matt Skerritt – video director
David Taylor – cameras
Chris Porter – bonus tracks live mixing
Neil Wilkes – BluRay mastering
Bearhand Design – artwork, design

Charts

References

External links
Tony Levin's diary entry for the first show in Mexico City
Tony Levin's diary entry for the second and third shows in Mexico City
Tony Levin's diary entry for the fourth and fifth shows in Mexico City

2018 live albums
King Crimson live albums
Discipline Global Mobile albums